A Call to the Martyrs is the debut album from the Christian deathcore band Mortal Treason.

Critical reception 

Andrew Sinft from Jesus Freak Hideout writes: "All in all, A Call to the Martyrs is a solid album and is a must have for any fan of metal or hardcore. Highlights include "Khampa Nomads," "A Walk Thru the Woods," and "Feed on the Weak" (which has an amazing breakdown). The biggest disappointment is the fact that other than a short acoustic track, the album is only eight songs long. Like the band, the album is strong but could have lasted longer." Mortal Treason from Alabama have been around for about five years now, defying mainstream Christian music tastes with their growing hardcore fanbase and passion for preaching Christ's salvation through music that's harder than a bag of your Gran's favourite mints. Lead vocalist Seth has been compared a couple of times to Cory Darst (ex-lead vocalist of Zao) in his approach to vocal sound and style, which can never be a bad thing, though when he occasionally speaks during the tracks he can sound a little two dimensional and uninspiring. This is only Mortal Treason's first album (a second is due soon) but their musicianship is already of fantastic standard. Every guitar riff worth bottling and surprising your pastor with on a Sunday morning.  My only gripe is of Seth's unimaginative song titles, his lyrics are quite good but he needs some tips from Bloodlined Calligraphy's Ally French on what he calls the tracks.

Track listing
"Khampa Nomads" – 5:33
"Walk Thru the Woods" – 5:59
"War Within" – 3:45
"A Call to the Martyrs" – 3:09
"Feed on the Weak" – 4:56
"Bride's Last Kiss" – 4:18
"Beneath the Shadows" – 3:13
"Todd" – 6:14
Hidden track – 3:33

Personnel
Mortal Treason
 Seth Kimbrough – vocals
 Josh Jarrett – guitar
 Richie Reale – guitar
 Alan Sears – bass
 Chase Nickens – drums

Production
 Nathan Dantzler - Engineer, Mastering, Mixing, Producer
 Ryan Dominguez - Assistant Engineer
 Bob Herdman - Executive Producer
 Will McGinniss - Executive Producer
 Sam Shifley - Engineer, Producer
 Mark Stuart - Executive Producer

References

Mortal Treason albums
2004 debut albums